Fidia (formerly known as Lypesthes) is a genus of leaf beetles in the subfamily Eumolpinae. It is distributed in East Asia, Southeast Asia and Africa.

Taxonomic history

In 1861, Victor Motschulsky described a new species of beetle from Japan with the name Fidia atra. In 1863, Joseph Sugar Baly designated Fidia atra as the type species of a newly established genus with the name Lypesthes. In a 2008 review of the New World genus Fidia Baly, 1863, it was determined that Motschulsky's species description made the name Fidia available first, meaning that Lypesthes Baly, 1863 is a junior synonym of Fidia Motschulsky, 1861 and that Fidia Baly, 1863 is a junior homonym.

An application to suppress Fidia Motschulsky, 1861 (with the year incorrectly given as "1860") and conserve usage of Fidia Baly, 1863 and Lypesthes Baly, 1863 was submitted to the ICZN in 2006. This proposal was rejected by the commission in 2009, upholding the priority of Fidia Motschulsky, 1861. Following this ruling, Fidia Baly, 1863 was renamed to Neofidia in 2020.

Species
There are 33 species currently recognised in the genus Fidia:

Subgenus Fidia Motschulsky, 1861

 Fidia albida (Pic, 1923)
 Fidia atra Motschulsky, 1861
 Fidia basalis (Chen, 1940)
 Fidia bicoloripes (Pic, 1936)
 Fidia bisquamosa (Chen, 1935)
 Fidia brancuccii (Medvedev, 1993)
 Fidia carinata (Eroshkina, 1992)
 Fidia fulva (Baly, 1878)
 Fidia gracilicornis (Baly, 1861)
 Fidia impressa (Pic, 1928)
 Fidia indica (Jacoby, 1908)
 Fidia irregularis (Eroshkina, 1992)
 Fidia itoi (Chûjô, 1954)
 Fidia japonica (Ohno, 1958)
 Fidia kiiensis (Ohno, 1958)
 Fidia laeta (Medvedev, 2007)
 Fidia lewisi (Baly, 1878)
 Fidia mausonica (Eroshkina, 1992)
 Fidia medvedevi Kumari et al., 2020
 Fidia perelegans (Gressitt & Kimoto, 1961)
 Fidia phoebicola (Tan, 1983)
 Fidia picea (Gressitt & Kimoto, 1961)
 Fidia regalis (Medvedev & Zoia, 1996)
 Fidia rufa (Pic, 1924)
 Fidia shirozui (Kimoto, 1969)
 Fidia sinensis (Gressitt & Kimoto, 1961)
 Fidia striata (Eroshkina, 1992)
 Fidia submaculata (Pic, 1924)
 Fidia subregularis (Pic, 1923)
 Fidia sulcatifrons (Gressitt & Kimoto, 1961)
 Fidia vietnamica (Eroshkina, 1992)
 Fidia vittata (Zhou & Tan, 1997)

Subgenus Lypesthinia Pic, 1939
 Fidia multidentata (Pic, 1939)

References

Eumolpinae
Chrysomelidae genera
Beetles of Asia
Beetles of Africa
Taxa named by Victor Motschulsky